The Lower Zakum Oil Field is the lower horizons of the Zakum oil field 84 km north west of Abu Dhabi Islands. 
The upper reservoir horizons are known as Upper Zakum oil field.

It was discovered in 1963 and developed by Abu Dhabi National Oil Company. 
The oil field is  owned by Abu Dhabi National Oil Company and operated by ADNOC Offshore.

The 40% foreign interest is split between Japan's INPEX (Lead partner - 10%), the Chinese CNPC (10%), India's ONGC Videsh (10%), Italy's ENI (5%) and France's Total 5%.

References 

Oil fields of the United Arab Emirates